Saginaw Transit Authority Regional Services, known as Saginaw STARS, is the operator of public transportation in Saginaw, Michigan. Ten local routes service the metropolitan area, and about a million passengers use the agency for transport each year.

Route list
1. State Street-Saginaw Township
2. Washington-Outer Drive-Veterans Memorial Parkway
3. Michigan-Mackinaw-Court
4. Janes-Holland-Buena Vista
5. 14th-Dixie-Genesee
6. Weiss-Bay-Tittabawassee
7. Washington-Gallagher
8. Jefferson-Hess-Sheridan
9. Cardinal Loop
11. Michigan-Woodbridge-Gratiot

These routes are available Monday–Friday 5:00am to 9:00pm and depart every 60 minutes.

Fares are $1.50 for general public, $.75 for riders 62 or older with identification, those receiving Medicare with ID, Silver Card (ADA/Disabled) and children under 42". Transfers are free, simply ask the driver when boarding.

Other services 
STARS Lift is a curb to curb service available for disabled riders and seniors over 62 with ID. These rides can be scheduled up to two weeks in advance by calling 989.752.9526. Fare is $2.75 each way with a gold card.

STARS Express service is available 24 hours, 7 days a week for riders' round the clock needs such as jobs, medical appointments and groceries. These rides can be scheduled up to 24 hours in advance. This service is first come first serve, so we recommend calling as close to 24 hours in advance as possible. Call to schedule or for more information 989.907.4040 or 989.753.9526. These rides are $5.25 each way.

Pigeon Express takes employees to Blue Diamond Steel & Huron Castings three times a day. Call for more information, 989.752.9526. Apply for a position at these companies at https://www.huroncasting.com/employment.php

Travel tips 

 Look up STARS on Facebook to keep up on all the latest news: https://www.facebook.com/SaginawTransitAuthority/
 For the latest route deviations and breaking updates, follow STARS on Facebook or Twitter: https://twitter.com/StarsSaginaw
 Please have your fare ready when boarding the bus for faster service. 
 Please arrive at your bus stop 5 minutes before your scheduled departure. 
 Decide when you want to arrive at your destination and work backward to find when you need to catch the bus. 
 Allow enough time for travel to the stops and potential delays.

Special services 
If you are in need of transportation for groups, EXPRESS service can be arranged within the service area.  Please contact Jamie Forbes, Director of Outreach and Program Development, with questions at jforbes@saginaw-stars.com.

References

External links
STARS

Bus transportation in Michigan
Saginaw, Michigan